Don Peter Atapattu (17 September 1899 – 14 December 1976), popularly known as D. P. Atapattu, was Sri Lankan lawyer and politician. He was the Parliamentary Secretary to the Cabinet Minister of State and  a Member of Parliament in Sri Lanka.

Born at Nakulugamuwa Walauwa, Nakulugamuwa; he received his secondary education at St Thomas' College, Mt. Lavinia and Ananda College, Colombo. Thereafter he qualified as a proctor from the Ceylon Law College and began a legal practice in Tangalle. He represented the United National Party from the Beliatta electorate in Hambantota district at six general parliamentary elections held between 1947 and 1965. He won in March 1960 and 1965, while his long-standing rival, D. A. Rajapaksa, won in 1947, 1952, 1956, and July 1960. In the 1965 Dudley Senanayake government, Atapattu was Parliamentary Secretary to the Cabinet Minister of State, J. R. Jayewardene. He died at his home in Tangalle on 14 December 1976. His son, Ranjit Atapattu, was Minister of Health from 1977 until 1989, and his grandson, Druvindra Atapattu, contested the 2009 General Election.

See also 
List of political families in Sri Lanka

References
 Sunday Times

1899 births
1976 deaths
Ceylonese proctors
Alumni of Ananda College
United National Party politicians
Members of the 4th Parliament of Ceylon
Members of the 6th Parliament of Ceylon
Parliamentary secretaries of Ceylon